The Edmonton Riverhawks are a collegiate summer baseball team. The Riverhawks are members of the West Coast League and play their home games at RE/MAX Field.

History 
In May 2020, Baseball Edmonton, a consortium headed by five-time Stanley Cup winner Randy Gregg along with 24 shareholders, secured a ten-year lease agreement with the City of Edmonton for RE/MAX Field.  The move beat out a proposal by the Edmonton Prospects of the Western Canadian Baseball League, who had been using the stadium since 2012. Baseball Edmonton agreed to fund upgrades to the ballpark including new artificial turf, scoreboard, and lighting.

On September 15, 2020, Baseball Edmonton announced the founding of the Edmonton Riverhawks, a West Coast League (WCL) expansion franchise to begin play in 2021. Edmonton's entry into the WCL was the first to be located in Alberta. Due to the distance between the Riverhawks and their league brethren the franchise subsidizes travel to teams visiting Edmonton.

The WCL's Canadian teams cancelled their 2021 seasons because of the COVID-19 pandemic in Canada, postponing the Riverhawks' debut to 2022.

The Riverhawks played their first game on May 31, 2022, against the Kamloops NorthPaws.

2022
The Riverhawks finished 5th in the North Division. Outfielder Clayton Loranger (college: Stephen F. Austin State University, hometown: Sherwood Park, Alberta) had the fourth best batting average in the league (.403). Outfielder Ivan Brethowr (college: Arizona State University, hometown: Olathe, Kansas) was second in the league in RBIs with 19. The Riverhawks were second in the league in attendance with 63,221 fans coming through the gates for an average of 2,342 fans per game.

Season-by-season record

References

Amateur baseball teams in Canada
2020 establishments in Alberta
Baseball teams established in 2020
Baseball teams in Edmonton